The 2001 Silicon Valley Football Classic was a post-season college football bowl game between the Michigan State Spartans and the Fresno State Bulldogs on December 31, 2001, at Spartan Stadium in San Jose, California. It was the second time the Silicon Valley Football Classic was played and the final game of the 2001 NCAA Division I-A football season for both teams. Michigan State defeated Fresno State 44–35.

Future NFL players David Carr, Jeff Smoker, Charles Rogers, TJ Duckett, and Bernard Berrian all played in this game.

Scoring summary

First Quarter
Fresno State – Stephen Spach 5 pass from David Carr (Asen Asparuhov kick), 14:01 left. 
Michigan State – Charles Rogers 72 pass from Jeff Smoker (Dave Rayner kick), 6:16 left. 
Michigan State – Monquiz Wedlow 0 fumble recovery (Dave Rayner kick), 5:54 left.
Fresno State – Rodney Wright 36 pass from David Carr (Asen Asparuhov kick), 3:20 left. 
Michigan State – FG Dave Rayner 41, 0:05 left. Drive: 7 plays, 59 yards, TOP 3:15.

Second Quarter
Michigan State – T.J. Duckett 5 run (Dave Rayner kick), 8:53 left.
Fresno State – Rodney Wright 79 pass from David Carr (Asen Asparuhov kick), 7:47 left. 
Michigan State – T.J. Duckett 39 run (Dave Rayner kick), 5:05 left.
Michigan State – Charles Rogers 69 pass from Jeff Smoker (Dave Rayner kick failed), 3:05 left.

Third Quarter
Fresno State – Paris Gaines 2 run (Asen Asparuhov kick), 6:54 left.

Fourth Quarter
Fresno State – Paris Gaines 15 pass from David Carr (Asen Asparuhov kick), 6:04 left. 
Michigan State – Ivory McCoy 5 pass from Jeff Smoker (Dave Rayner kick), 1:59 left.

Statistics

References

Silicon Valley Classic
Silicon Valley Football Classic
Fresno State Bulldogs football bowl games
Michigan State Spartans football bowl games